Lawrence Percy Farrar L'Estrange OBE was a British diplomat. 

L'Estrange was born on 10 September 1912 in Costa Rica to William Samuel (1877-1956) and Louisa Knights Farrer. William had been born in Etah, British Raj and Farrer was born in Guadalupe, Costa Rica. 

L'Estrange served as the British Ambassador to Honduras from 1969 to 1972, serving at the time of the Football War between Honduras and El Salvador.

L'Estrange married Anne Catherine Whiteside in 1935 in Caracas, Venezuela. They had two sons, Larry (1934-2007) and John (1937-2022), born in England and Venezuela respectively. Larry L'Estrange became a professional rugby player, capped for Ireland. 

As a diplomat, L'Estrange held various posts in Latin America. He was awarded the OBE for services to diplomacy. 

L'Estrange also had consular posts in Manila and Denver. L'Estrange died in London in 1991, aged 78.

References 

1912 births
1991 deaths
British diplomats
British expatriates in Costa Rica
British expatriates in Honduras